Loudoun Academy is a secondary school in the outskirts of Galston, East Ayrshire, in Scotland serving the Loudoun district which includes the Irvine Valley, Kilmarnock, and surrounding rural areas of East Ayrshire. The school was built in 1971. The current enrolment as of July 2022 was 926.

In 2022, Loudoun Academy was ranked as the 201st best performing state school in Scotland, an increase from its 2021 ranking where it was placed at 216th.

History and staffing
Mr Rob Findlay retired in June 1994 as Rector, and he died in 2017 aged 82 years. The previous Headmaster Brian Johnston retired in 2009, and was succeeded by Peter Flood. Flood left the school in 2012 to a new position in Perth, leaving Graeme Walker as Acting Head Teacher.

The role was then passed onto Linda McCauley-Griffiths who held the post until December 2017 when she was appointed as the new Head of Education for East Ayrshire Council.

In January 2018, Scott Robertson was appointed Acting Head Teacher, and in April 2018, Robertson was appointed the permanent Head Teacher following interviews. Mr Robertson moved in March 2022 to Grange Academy, Kilmarnock as Head Teacher.

In August 2022, David Falconer (previously Depute Head Teacher at Lanark Grammar School, South Lanarkshire) took up post as Head Teacher of Loudoun Academy.

Uniform
Pupils at Loudoun Academy are encouraged to wear a school blazer in Senior School (S4-S6), with this being optional for Junior pupils (S1-S3). Grey or black trousers or skirt is expected, as are black school shoes.

Notable alumni
 Alan Brown  (born 1970), Scottish National Party Member of Parliament (MP)
Graeme Obree, twice world one hour track cycling record holder attended.

See also
 List of schools in Scotland

References

External links
 Official School Website
 Loudoun Academy's page on Scottish Schools Online
 The old Loudoun Nature Trail in the Orchard Plantation

Secondary schools in East Ayrshire
School of Rugby
1970 establishments in Scotland
Educational institutions established in 1970